Jeffrey Paul Manto (born August 23, 1964) is an American former journeyman baseball player and hitting coach. Manto is currently the manager of the Trenton Thunder of the MLB Draft League. He is a member of eight Halls of Fame. Manto played in Major League Baseball (MLB) for the Cleveland Indians, Philadelphia Phillies, Baltimore Orioles, Boston Red Sox, Seattle Mariners, Detroit Tigers, New York Yankees, and Colorado Rockies. He also played in Nippon Professional Baseball (NPB) for the Yomiuri Giants.

Early career
Manto attended Temple University, where he accepted a full scholarship as a RH pitcher.  After his freshman year, Manto was converted to a RF.  During his Temple career Manto had a career BA of .412. He also held Owl records for most bases, extra base hits, highest HR percentage, and highest slugging percentage. Member of 2 Atlantic 10 Championships.  Inducted into Temple University HOF in 2000. Manto was drafted in the 35th round of the 1982 Major League Baseball Draft by the New York Yankees as a RH Pitcher, but opted not to sign with them.  Three years later, he entered again into the draft where he was drafted in the 14th round of the 1985 Major League Baseball Draft by the California Angels and signed on June 7, 1985 in that same year.

Professional career

Playing career
Manto was drafted by the Angels in 1985.  He played 16 years and finally retired after the 2000 season.  During that span, Manto was part of three World Series teams: the 1993 Philadelphia Phillies, the 1997 Cleveland Indians, and the 1999 New York Yankees.

Manto's nickname in his playing days was "Mickey". (Except during his short 21-game stint with the Seattle Mariners in 1996, where he was known as "Manto Can't-o" for his rally-killing .185 batting average)

Manto won the Texas League Most Valuable Player in 1988 and the International League Most Valuable Player Award. In 1994, a season in which he played for both the Norfolk Tides and the Rochester Red Wings, he won the International League Most Valuable Player.

Manto tied a major league record with four consecutive home runs in four consecutive official at bats.

Manto's most sustained run with one team was a stretch as a member of the Buffalo Bisons, at the time the Indians' Class AAA affiliate. In four interrupted years (1997–2000) with the Bisons, Manto hit 79 home runs. For his achievements, Manto's number 30 was retired by the Bisons, one of only three players (Luke Easter and Ollie Carnegie being the others) to have earned the honor.

Though Manto's stay in Rochester was brief, he forever made a name for himself in franchise history. In the winter of 1995, the city of Rochester was at risk of losing the franchise. Governor George Pataki had reversed a previous decision of his, and opted to deny the city the state funds needed to build the new stadium and keep the Red Wings in town. When team owners staged a rally called "StadiumStock" Jeff, along with his father Michael, drove from Philadelphia through a massive snowstorm to attend the rally. Manto spoke at great length of his passion for the city, its fans, and the Silver family, which ran the Red Wings. The rally was successful and funding was restored. Manto made the Orioles team the following spring. After Baltimore let him go the following winter, Manto signed on with the Yomiuri Giants in Japan, but struggled. He was released. Though he called Baltimore several times about signing a minor league deal, Syd Thrift, the Orioles GM, declined. Manto ended up in Syracuse and then Buffalo. However, the Orioles decision not to bring back Manto to Rochester after what he did to help keep the franchise intact inflicted a wound that never healed, and the once warm relationship between Rochester and Baltimore began to show chinks in the armour.

Coaching career
After Manto's playing career ended, he worked as a hitting coach, as well as manager for the Philadelphia Phillies’ Lakewood BlueClaws. Was hired as the Pittsburgh Pirates Hitting Coordinator in 2003 and then was named the Pittsburgh Pirates hitting coach in November 2005. He was the hitting coach for the Pirates for two seasons from 2006–2007. In 2006, Manto phelped guide Freddy Sanchez to the NL Batting Title with a .344 batting average. Also, during his time as the Pirates hitting coach, Manto saw the future breakout potential of then Pirate, José Bautista. According to Keith Olbermann, Manto had said of Bautista, "If we can get him to replicate his swing three days in a row, José Bautista could hit 25 homers a year. In fact, I think he could hit 40. He is just so easily frustrated when it doesn’t go right that he blames himself and forgets what he's learned. Or ignores it. But of all these guys I have, if you want one of them who will eventually do something special in this game, I’d pick him. I wouldn’t be very surprised."

On October 31, 2011, Manto was named hitting coach for the Chicago White Sox where he helped guide Adam Dunn to AL Comeback Player of the Year in 2012.

He currently serves as the Minor League Hitting Coordinator for the Baltimore Orioles.

On April 12, 2021, Manto was announced as the manager of the Trenton Thunder for the inaugural season of the MLB Draft League.

Honors
Manto is a member of 8 Halls of Fame:
 Bristol High School HOF
 Bucks County (Pa) HOF
 Temple University HOF
 Pennsylvania Sports HOF
 Buffalo Bison HOF
 Rochester Red Wings HOF
 Greater Buffalo HOF
 International League HOF.  

His Number 30 is Retired for the Buffalo Bisons. He also has numerous artifacts in the Baseball Hall of Fame in Cooperstown, NY.

He's been a member of three World Series teams: 
 1993 NL Phillies
 1997 AL Cleveland Indians
 1999 AL NY Yankees

Records
 Tied MLB record for 4 consecutive HR's in 4 consecutive AB's.  
 Tied AL record for 5 HR in 3 games.

References

External links

Manto Player Development Center 

1964 births
Living people
American expatriate baseball players in Canada
American expatriate baseball players in Japan
Baltimore Orioles players
Baseball coaches from Pennsylvania
Baseball players from Pennsylvania
Boston Red Sox players
Bowie Baysox players
Buffalo Bisons (minor league) players
Chicago White Sox coaches
Cleveland Indians players
Colorado Rockies players
Colorado Springs Sky Sox players
Detroit Tigers players
Edmonton Trappers players
Frederick Keys players
International League MVP award winners
Midland Angels players
New York Yankees players
Nippon Professional Baseball third basemen
Norfolk Tides players
Palm Springs Angels players
Pawtucket Red Sox players
People from Bristol, Pennsylvania
Philadelphia Phillies players
Pittsburgh Pirates coaches
Quad Cities Angels players
Richmond Braves players
Rochester Red Wings players
Scranton/Wilkes-Barre Red Barons players
Seattle Mariners players
Syracuse SkyChiefs players
Temple Owls baseball players
Trenton Thunder players
Yomiuri Giants players